José Luis Murillo Torres (born 24 February 1957) is a Mexican politician affiliated with the National Action Party. As of 2014 he served as Deputy of the LX Legislature of the Mexican Congress representing Nuevo León.

References

1957 births
Living people
Politicians from Nuevo León
National Action Party (Mexico) politicians
21st-century Mexican politicians
Deputies of the LX Legislature of Mexico
Members of the Chamber of Deputies (Mexico) for Nuevo León